The 1990 Mindanao crisis began when Col. Alexander Noble and his supporters seized two military garrisons in Cagayan de Oro and Butuan without firing a shot and unilaterally proclaimed the independence of the Federal Republic of Mindanao on October 4, 1990. The proclaimed state according to Noble has a civilian-military junta as government. Noble later announced the next day that he is calling for dialogue with the Philippine government.

Government response
Corazon Aquino urged the country's security forces to stop the rebellion initiated by Noble. The Armed Forces of the Philippines was put into red alert. Hundreds of troops were stationed near the headquarters of the Armed Forces of the Philippines in Manila due to a military report months before the rebellion warning of a coup attempt would follow an uprising in Mindanao. Troops with anti-aircraft weaponry were stationed around the military compound while troops with anti-tank weaponry and machine gun stationed within the walled compound and outside its gates. Aquino's military advisor, Mariano Adalem in a briefing for foreign diplomats that Noble's actions in Mindanao may be a distraction, and his actions in Mindanao is a regional destabilization effort leading to a coup de etat.

On October 5, two T-28 planes from Mactan Air Base in Cebu bombed the occupied garrison in Butuan forcing the occupiers to evacuate the garrison.

On October 6, Noble unconditionally surrendered to Sen. Aquilino Pimentel in Cagayan de Oro at 3:00 am. Reuben Canoy, Noble's primary civilian ally and leader of the Mindanao Independence Movement was also arrested. Noble was escorted to Manila by military officials led by Brig. Gen Arturo Enrile, superintendent of the Philippine Military Academy. Despite the arrest, Noble says that he is successful in his goal into bringing attention to the issues affecting Mindanao.

International reaction
  – US ambassador Nicholas Platt said that America "strongly condemns any effort to destabilize the elected Philippine government."

References

Rebellions in the Philippines
1990 in the Philippines
History of Misamis Oriental
History of Agusan del Norte
Presidency of Corazon Aquino
Attempted coups in the Philippines